Pantun is a Malay oral poetic form used to express intricate ideas and emotions. It generally consists of even-numbered lines and based on ABAB rhyming schemes. However, they are always connected by the rhymes and other verbal associations, such as puns and repeating sounds. There is also an oblique but necessary relationship and the first statement often turns out to be a metaphor for the second one.

The form of pantun grew and spread from the Srivijaya Empire in Sumatra, Indonesia. The earliest literary records of  date back to the 15th century, as it was featured in the most important Malay literary text, the Malay Annals.  is regarded as a high art and has been the integral part of classical Malay literature. It also thrived as a natural part in the daily communication of traditional Malay society and served as the important expressive tool in Malay songs, rituals, performing arts and in all form of storytelling.

Etymology
According to Za'aba, the word  is thought to evolve from the Malay word  (Jawi: سڤنتون) meaning 'same as'. The word is used to signify a proverbial metaphor or simile, a type of figure of speech commonly found in traditional  or proverbs from classical Malay literature.

Other theory suggests that  originated from the word  ('guider'), from noun-building prefix  and the verb  (Jawi:تونتون) or 'to guide'. Winstedt supported this opinion, noting that in many Austronesian languages, words which suggest 'something set out in rows' gradually gain the new meaning of 'well-arranged words', in prose or in poetry.

History 
Some scholars believe that  predates literacy and maybe as old as the Malay language itself, Muhammad Haji Salleh believe that  form grew and spread from Srivijaya, and most probably from around the city of Palembang or Malayu. When Palembang became more dominant,  of the two cities would be known to each other's population, and while they used the same language, they were adversaries politically. Nevertheless, the tradition was known to have reached its refined form with the flowering of classical Malay literature from the 15th century.

For at least 500 years,  spread from Malay language through trade routes, ports, and migrations and became the most dynamic single literary form. Today, it is known in at least 40 dialects of Malay, and 35 non-Malay languages, in the Malay Peninsula and many of the islands of Maritime Southeast Asia. The popularity of  among hybrid communities like Peranakans, Chitty and Kristang people, signifies its preeminent position as a cultural symbol in the Malay world. A type of  called  that consists of interwoven quatrains, was introduced to Western poetry in the 19th century by Ernest Fouinet and later popularised by Victor Hugo, that forms the basis of modern pantoum.

Tradition 
The  originated as a traditional oral form of expression, manifesting the traditional Malay views of life and their surroundings, and utilized to express an endless range of emotions and ideas. As a symbol of Malay identity,  are known to be the reflections of adat ('customs) and adab ('manners'). As Malay culture emphasised the importance of polite and indirect expressions, s are generally created in styles portraying various forms of figurative language.  Elements of metaphors, similes, symbols, personifications, eponyms, allusions, idioms and proverbs are abound in the elegantly compacted Malay .

In Malay culture,  is an important instrument of communication in various social, cultural, and economic activities. It is used traditionally to express feelings, to give advice, to exchange quizzes, and also to sweeten conversations. For example,  are used in the customary verbal exchange in a Malay wedding (or engagement) ceremony, especially as part of the culturally sanctioned greetings between the representatives of the bridegroom and the bride upon their arrival at the bride house. As an expressive tool,  are also used extensively in the lyrics of traditional Malay songs that tuned to the popular rhythms like Zapin, Inang and Joget. Other notable application of  can be found as a structural support for art performances like Dondang sayang, Bangsawan, Mak yong, Mek Mulung and Dikir barat. The skill in performing these poems is to recite in a way to suggest a form of singing while at the same time conjure up the ability to engage in quick, witty and subtle dialogue.

Indonesia possesses a wealth of verbal art. A largely nonwritten tradition of reciting expressive, often witty quatrains called  is common in most Malay areas throughout the archipelago. Some  performances are narrative; the  traditions of central and eastern Java, for instance, use  structure (which is called ) to recount religious or local historical tales to the accompaniment of a drum, although this appears to be modern adaptations, as writers from the early 20th century like H Overbeck and JJ De Hollander noted that a tradition similar to  did not exist in Javanese at that time. Indeed, much of Indonesia's traditional literature forms the foundation of complex mixed-genre performances, such as the Randai of the Minangkabau of western Sumatra, which blends instrumental music, dance, drama, and martial arts in ceremonial settings.

Description
In its most basic form, the  consists of a quatrain which employs an abab rhyme scheme. A  is traditionally recited according to a fixed rhythm and as a rule of thumb, in order not to deviate from the rhythm, every line should contain between eight and 12 syllables. "The  is a four-lined verse consisting of alternating, roughly rhyming lines. The first and second lines sometimes appear completely disconnected in meaning from the third and fourth, but there is almost invariably a link of some sort. Whether it be a mere association of ideas, or of feeling, expressed through assonance or through the faintest nuance of thought, it is nearly always traceable" (Sim, page 12). The  is highly allusive and in order to understand it, readers generally need to know the traditional meaning of the symbols the poem employs. An example (followed by a translation by Katharine Sim):

According to Sim,  literally means 'a floating coconut shell at sixes and sevens'.  ('sweet basil') implies 'lover', because it rhymes with the word for that, . Other frequently recurring symbols are the flower and the bee, indicating a girl and her lover, the squirrel implying a seducer, and the water hyacinth meaning love that will not take root. The  often makes use of proverbs as well as geographical and historical allusions, for example, the following poem by Munshi Abdullah:

This alludes to the foundation of Singapore in 1819 by Sir Stamford Raffles. The last line means a girl who is protected by a powerful man, and Sim suggests this may refer to Raffles's wife Olivia.

This follows the abab rhyme scheme with the second and fourth lines of each stanza becoming the first and third lines of the following stanza. Finally, the first and third lines of the first stanza become the second and fourth lines of the last stanza, usually in reverse order so that the first and last lines of the poem are identical. This form of  has exercised the most influence on Western literature, in which it is known as the pantoum.

See also
Pantoum
Gurindam
Hainteny
Sisindiran
Syair

References

Sources

External links
 
 
 Pantun.com

Malay-language poems
Intangible Cultural Heritage of Humanity